Balih of Kish was the fourteenth Sumerian king in the First Dynasty of Kish, according to the Sumerian king list. His father was Etana, whom he succeeded as ruler. The kings on the early part of the SKL are usually not considered historical, except when they are mentioned in Early Dynastic documents. Balih is not one of them.

References 

|-

Kings of Kish
Sumerian kings